Nucingen House is a 2008 French-Romanian-Chilean film directed by Chilean filmmaker Raúl Ruiz.

Cast
Jean-Marc Barr
Elsa Zylberstein
Laurent Malet
Audrey Marnay
Laure de Clermont-Tonnerre

References

2008 films
Films based on works by Honoré de Balzac
Films directed by Raúl Ruiz
French horror films
2000s French films